UFC 155: dos Santos vs. Velasquez 2 was a mixed martial arts event held by the Ultimate Fighting Championship on December 29, 2012, at the MGM Grand Garden Arena in Las Vegas, Nevada.

Background
A Junior dos Santos vs. Cain Velasquez rematch had been expected since May 26, 2012 at UFC 146, where dos Santos defended his Heavyweight championship against Frank Mir and Velasquez defeated Antônio Silva. Velasquez and dos Santos had already fought once on November 12, 2011 at UFC on Fox: Velasquez vs. Dos Santos, where dos Santos won via knockout in the first round. Alistair Overeem, former DREAM and Strikeforce champion, was expected to face the winner of this bout. He was originally expected to face dos Santos for the title at UFC 146; however, on April 4, 2012, Overeem was revealed to have failed his pre-fight drug test by the Nevada State Athletic Commission (NSAC). He was found to have an elevated testosterone to epitestosterone ratio of 14-to-1, over the allowed ratio rate of 6-to-1.

Chael Sonnen was expected to face Forrest Griffin at this event. However, Sonnen was pulled from the fight to coach the seventeenth season of The Ultimate Fighter opposite UFC Light Heavyweight champion Jon Jones and was replaced by Phil Davis. Griffin was then forced out of the bout with a knee injury and Davis was pulled from the card altogether.

A bout between Erik Koch and Ricardo Lamas was expected to take place at this event. However, the bout was moved to UFC on Fox 6 and promoted to the main card.

Gray Maynard was expected to face Joe Lauzon at this event. However, Maynard was forced out of the bout with an injury and replaced by Jim Miller.

Matt Mitrione was expected to face Phil De Fries at this event. However, due to an injury sustained by Shane Carwin, Mitrione stepped in as a replacement against Roy Nelson at The Ultimate Fighter 16 Finale and was replaced by the returning Todd Duffee.

Chris Weidman was expected to face Tim Boetsch at this event. However, Weidman was forced out of the bout with a shoulder injury and was replaced by Costas Philippou.

Karlos Vemola was expected to face Chris Leben at this event. However, Vemola was forced out of the bout with an injury and was replaced by Strikeforce veteran Derek Brunson.

Cody McKenzie was expected to face Leonard Garcia at this event. However, McKenzie was forced out of the bout and was replaced by Max Holloway.

A bout between Melvin Guillard and Jamie Varner, originally scheduled for The Ultimate Fighter 16 Finale, was rescheduled for this event after Varner fell ill the night of the event.

Results

Bonus awards
Fighters were awarded $65,000 bonuses.

 Fight of the Night: Jim Miller vs. Joe Lauzon
 Knockout of the Night: Todd Duffee
 Submission of the Night: John Moraga

Reported payout

The following is the reported payout to the fighters as reported to the Nevada State Athletic Commission. It does not include sponsor money and also does not include the UFC's traditional "fight night" bonuses.
 Cain Velasquez: $200,000 (includes $100,000 win bonus) def. Junior dos Santos: $400,000
 Jim Miller: $82,000 (includes $41,000 win bonus) def. Joe Lauzon: $27,000
 Costas Philippou: $36,000 (includes $18,000 win bonus) def. Tim Boetsch: $37,000
 Yushin Okami: $84,000 (includes $42,000 win bonus) def. Alan Belcher: $37,000
 Derek Brunson: $30,000 (includes $15,000 win bonus) def. Chris Leben: $51,000
 Eddie Wineland: $30,000 (includes $15,000 win bonus) def. Brad Pickett: $17,000
 Érik Pérez: $20,000 (includes $10,000 win bonus) def. Byron Bloodworth: $6,000
 Jamie Varner: $24,000 (includes $12,000 win bonus) def. Melvin Guillard: $42,000
 Myles Jury: $16,000 (includes $8,000 win bonus) def. Michael Johnson: $14,000
 Todd Duffee: $16,000 (includes $8,000 win bonus) def. Phil De Fries: $8,000
 Max Holloway: $24,000 (includes $12,000 win bonus) def. Leonard Garcia: $20,000
 John Moraga: $22,000 (includes $11,000 win bonus) def. Chris Cariaso: $12,000

See also
List of UFC events
2012 in UFC

References

External links
Official UFC past events page
UFC events results at Sherdog.com

Ultimate Fighting Championship events
2012 in mixed martial arts
Mixed martial arts in Las Vegas
2012 in sports in Nevada
MGM Grand Garden Arena